The Ya is a  river in the municipality of Tynset in Innlandet county, Norway.

The river starts as the confluence of the Nordya (North Ya) and Storya (Big Ya) north of the Grøntjørnan farm. The Midtya (Middle Ya) is a higher tributary of the Nordya. The largest source of the Ya is Falningsjøen (Lake Falning, elevation ) via the tributary Falninga; the lake is used as a reservoir for the Ulset Hydroelectric Power Station. The river is a right tributary of the Orkla River, which it flows into from the east with its mouth at Yset near Norwegian National Road 3. The Ya river system runs through Forollhogna National Park and the Grøntjønnan Nature Reserve.

References

Tynset
Rivers of Innlandet